
The following lists events that happened during 1845 in South Africa.

Events
 The road from Cape Town to Stellenbosch through the Maitland area is completed
 The Voortrekker settlement of Ohrigstad is founded
 Natal becomes an autonomous district of Cape Colony
 Battle of Zwartkoppies
 The Berlin Mission Society establishes a mission station at Pniel

References
See Years in South Africa for list of References

Years in South Africa